Alex Miller (born 20 November 2000) is a Namibian road cyclist and mountain biker.  In February 2018, he won the Namibian National Road Race Championships.

Major results

Road

2017
 National Junior Road Championships
2nd Road race
2nd Time trial
2018
 3rd  Team time trial, African Junior Road Championships
2019
 1st  Road race, National Road Championships
 National Under-23 Road Championships
1st  Road race
1st  Time trial
 3rd Nedbank Cycle Classic
2021
 National Under-23 Road Championships
1st  Road race
1st  Time trial

Mountain Bike

2017
 3rd  Cross-country, African Junior Championships
2018
 1st  Cross-country, African Junior Championships
2019
 1st  Cross-country, National Championships
 African Games
2nd  Cross-country
3rd  Marathon
 African Championships
2nd  Team relay
3rd  Cross-country
2020
 1st  Cross-country, National Championships
 1st  Marathon, National Championships
2021
 1st  Cross-country, National Championships
 1st  Marathon, National Championships
2022
 1st  Cross-country, African Championships
 National Championships
1st  Cross-country
1st  Marathon
 3rd  Cross-country, Commonwealth Games

References

External links
 

2000 births
Living people
Namibian male cyclists
African Games silver medalists for Namibia
Competitors at the 2019 African Games
African Games medalists in cycling
Cyclists at the 2020 Summer Olympics
Olympic cyclists of Namibia
White Namibian people
21st-century Namibian people
Commonwealth Games bronze medallists for Namibia
Commonwealth Games medallists in cycling
Cyclists at the 2022 Commonwealth Games
Medallists at the 2022 Commonwealth Games